The 2020–21 Nepal Tri-Nation Series was a Twenty20 international cricket tournament that took place in April 2021 in Nepal. The participating teams were Nepal, Malaysia and the Netherlands. The matches were all played at the Tribhuvan University International Cricket Ground in Kirtipur. The tournament was played in a double round-robin format, followed by a final between the top two sides.

The penultimate round-robin match, between Malaysia and the Netherlands, ended in a tie. It was a rain-curtailed game  with no Super Over taking place due to the lost time. This result meant that the Netherlands and Nepal advanced to the final. Nepal defeated the Netherlands in the final by 142 runs to win the series.

Squads

Netherlands coach Ryan Campbell selected a squad missing several English county-based players and New Zealand-based Logan van Beek. Malaysia's coach Bilal Asad named an experienced squad including captain Ahmad Faiz, vice-captain Virandeep Singh and former national captain Anwar Arudin. The Cricket Association of Nepal (CAN) initially named a preliminary squad of twenty players, with senior players Basant Regmi and Sharad Vesawkar rested. Nepal announced their final squad of fifteen players on 14 April. The day before the tournament, Paras Khadka was ruled out of the series due to a shoulder injury and replaced by Sundeep Jora.

Round robin

Points table

Source: ESPN Cricinfo

Fixtures

Final

References

External links
Series home at ESPN Cricinfo

2021 in Dutch cricket
Associate international cricket competitions in 2020–21
2021 in Nepalese cricket